The 2017–18  DFB-Pokal was the 38th season of the cup competition, Germany's second-most important title in women's football.

Wolfsburg defeated Bayern Munich after penalties to win their fourth consecutive title.

Results

First round
The draw was held on 12 July 2017. Matches were played on 26 and 27 August 2017. The eleven best clubs of 2016–17 Bundesliga season received a bye.

|}

Second round
The draw was held on 28 August 2017. The matches were played on 7 and 8 October 2017. The eleven best placed Bundesliga teams from last season joined the 21 winners of the previous round.

|}

Round of 16
The draw was held on 29 October 2017. Matches were played on 2 and 3 December 2017, while some game were postponed due to bad weather, but only one game was played on 13 December 2017, the other two games were postponed again. Those games were played on 9 and 11 February 2018.

|}

Quarterfinals
The draw was held on 7 January 2018. Matches were played on 13 and 14 March 2018.

|}

Semifinals
The draw was held on 19 March 2018. Matches were played on 15 April 2018.

Final
The final was held on 19 May 2018 at the RheinEnergieStadion in Cologne.

References

External links
Official website

Women
2017–18 in German women's football
2017-18